Monroe Dunaway Anderson was a banker and cotton trader.

M.D. (or MD) Anderson may also refer to:

University of Texas MD Anderson Cancer Center
M.D. Anderson Library, the main general collection library of the University of Houston Libraries